Transbaikal, Trans-Baikal, Transbaikalia, or Dauria (Dauriya) is a mountainous region to the east of or "beyond" (trans-) Lake Baikal in Far Eastern Russia.

The steppe and wetland landscapes of Dauria are protected by the Daurian Nature Reserve, which forms part of a World Heritage Site named "The Landscapes of Dauria".

Etymology
The alternative name of the Transbaikal, Dauria, derives from the ethnonym of the former inhabitants, the Daur people, whom Russian explorers first encountered in 1640.

Geography 
Dauria stretches for almost 1,000 km from north to south from the Patom Plateau and North Baikal Plateau to the Russian state borders with Mongolia and China. The Transbaikal region covers more than 1,000 km from west to east from Lake Baikal to the meridian of the confluence of the Shilka and Argun Rivers. To the west and north lies the Irkutsk Oblast; to the north the Republic of Sakha (Yakutia), to the east the Amur Oblast.

History 

The ancient proto-Mongol Slab Grave Culture occupied the area around Lake Baikal in the Transbaikal territory.

In Imperial Russia, Dauria itself became an oblast - the Transbaikal Oblast, established in 1851, with its capital at Nerchinsk, then at Chita. It became part of the short-lived Far Eastern Republic between 1920 and 1922.

The administration of historic Transbaikalia  includes Buryatia and the Zabaykalsky Krai; the area makes up nearly all of the territory of these two federal subjects.

Fauna and flora
The region has given its name to various animal species including Daurian hedgehog, and the following birds: Asian brown flycatcher (Muscicapa daurica), Daurian jackdaw, Daurian partridge, Daurian redstart, Daurian starling, Daurian shrike and the red-rumped swallow (Hirundo daurica). The Mongolian wild ass (Equus hemionus hemionus) is extinct in the region.

The common name of the famous Dahurian larch (Larix gmelinii) as well as that of the Dahurian buckthorn (Rhamnus davurica) are also derived from the same source.

Geography
Oktyabrsky (Октябрьский) village, Amur Oblast, near the Russia-China border is a large site of uranium mining and processing facilities.

Part of the area is protected by the Dauria Nature Reserve.

See also
 Ookteechenskaia
 Khentei-Daur Highlands
 Po dikim stepyam Zabaikalya

References

External links

WWF Russia

Geography of Siberia
Historical regions in Russia
Geography of Northeast Asia
History of Siberia
Regions of Russia